The Old Post Office is a historic former post office building at 120 West Poplar Street in Rogers, Arkansas. It is a Georgian Revival single-story brick building, built in 1917 to a design by the Office of the Supervising Architect. The building served as the city's main post office until the late 1940s. It was then adapted to house the Rogers Public Library, which occupied the premises between 1963 and 1994. An example of Georgian Revival architecture, it was listed on the National Register of Historic Places in 1988 as "Rogers Post Office Building".

See also
National Register of Historic Places listings in Benton County, Arkansas

References

Post office buildings on the National Register of Historic Places in Arkansas
Colonial Revival architecture in Arkansas
Government buildings completed in 1917
Buildings and structures in Rogers, Arkansas
National Register of Historic Places in Benton County, Arkansas
Individually listed contributing properties to historic districts on the National Register in Arkansas